Cicalengka Station (Stasiun Cicalengka) is a railway station at Cicalengka, Bandung Regency, West Java, Indonesia.

Services 
 Lokal Bandung Raya to 
 Serayu to 
 Malabar to 
 Kutojaya Selatan to

References

External links 
 
  

Bandung Regency
Railway stations in West Java
railway stations opened in 1884